Miloš Mikeln (23 May 1930 – 1 April 2014) was a Slovene writer, playwright, theatre director and journalist. He was president of Slovene PEN and was the initiator of the Writers for Peace Committee, founded in 1984. He was the Committee chairman for the first decade of its existence. The Committee still operates within the fold of PEN International to this day, providing a platform for literary and intercultural dialogue and understanding.

Life
Mikeln was born Alojz Martin Mikeln in Celje in 1930. He attended school in Celje until 1947 when he moved to Ljubljana where he first studied comparative literature at the University of Ljubljana and in 1952 enrolled at the Academy for Theatre, Radio, Film and Television. He worked in theatres in Kranj and Ljubljana, as an editor at the newspapers Delo and Naši razgledi and as Director of the Cankarjeva založba publishing house.

In 1993 he received the Kresnik Award for his novel Veliki voz (The Great Bear). In 1995 he was given the Silver Order of Freedom of the Republic of Slovenia for his work with Writers for Peace.

Selected works
 Veliki voz (The Great Bear), novel, 1992
 Poročnik z Vipote (Lieutenant from Vipota), novel, 2002
 Mesto ob reki (Riverside Town), short stories, 2008

Plays
 Dež v pomladni noči (Rain on a Spring Night), drama, 1955
 Atomske bombe ni več (The Atom Bomb is No More), youth play, 1956
 Petra Šeme pozna poroka (The Late Marriage of Peter Šema), comedy, 1957
 Golobje miru (Doves of Peace), comedy, 1960
 Strip strup denarja kup (Funny Runny Pots of Money), youth play, 1964
 Stalinovi zdravniki (Stalin's Doctors), drama, 1972
 Afera Madragol (The Madragol Affair), comedy, 1977
 Miklavžev večer (The Eve of St Nicholas'), comedy, 1998

Satirical prose
 Jugoslavija za začetnike (Yugoslavia for Beginners), 1967
 Kako se je naša dolina privadila svobodi (How Our Valley Got Used to Freedom), 1973
 Adolfa Hitlerja tretja svetovna vojna in kratki kurz vladanja za začetnike, (Adolf Hitler's Third World War and a Short Course in Ruling for Beginners), 1980
 Zgaga vojvodine Kranjske, (All this Fuss in the Duchy of Carniola) 1985
 Poročilo delovne skupine za ruiniranje države in kratki kurz Vladanje za srednjo (usmerjeno) stopnjo (Report of the Working Committee for the Ruination of the State and a Short Course in Ruling for Intermediate Level), 1989

Biography

 Stalin: življenjska pot samodržca (Biography of Stalin), 1985

References

1930 births
2014 deaths
Writers from Celje
Slovenian dramatists and playwrights
Yugoslav science fiction writers
Kresnik Award laureates
Recipients of the Order of Freedom of the Republic of Slovenia
20th-century dramatists and playwrights